Mate Kapović (born August 5, 1981 in Zagreb) is a Croatian linguist specializing in Indo-European, Slavic languages and the Proto-Balto-Slavic language. He studied Croatian language and linguistics at the Faculty of Arts of University of Zagreb. He graduated in 2003 and he has been teaching at the same university since 2004. In 2007, he obtained his doctorate at the Faculty of Philosophy of University of Zadar (Reconstruction of Balto-Slavic Personal Pronouns with Emphasis on Accentuation).

In 2010, he was appointed docent at the University of Zagreb, and in 2014, he was appointed associate professor. At the Faculty of Arts, he lectures on general phonology, historical-comparative linguistics, phonology and Indo-European morphology. His academic interests include accentology, sociolinguistics, dialectology and language policy. He is a member of the Committee of Dialectology at the Department of Philological Sciences of the Croatian Academy of Sciences and Arts.

He has authored the following books: Uvod u indoeuropsku lingvistiku: Pregled jezikâ i poredbena fonologija (2008), Čiji je jezik? (2011), Povijest hrvatske akcentuacije: Fonetika (2015). In 2019, he coauthored Jeziku je svejedno (2019), a book devoted to the phenomenon of prescriptivism in Croatian linguistics. He has published  numerous articles in Croatian and international journals. He is engaged in criticism of linguistic purism and prescriptivism. He was the initiator of the annual conference International Workshop on Balto-Slavic Accentology (IWoBA).

Selected works
 Uvod u indoeuropsku lingvistiku: Pregled jezikâ i poredbena fonologija (2008)
 O „pravilnosti” u jeziku (2009)
 Čiji je jezik? (2011)
 Language, ideology, and politics in Croatia (2011)
 Ogledi o kapitalizmu i demokraciji (2015)
 Povijest hrvatske akcentuacije: Fonetika (2016)
 O preskripciji i preskriptivizmu u Hrvatskoj (coauthor, 2016)
 The Indo-European Languages (ed., 2nd edition)
 Jeziku je svejedno (coauthor, 2019)

References

Linguists from Croatia
Academic staff of the University of Zagreb
1981 births
University of Zagreb alumni
Living people